This article describes the history of South African cricket from 1971 to 1990. Following the D'Oliveira affair in 1968, feeling against South Africa's application of apartheid to sport grew to the extent that by 1971 the country was isolated in sporting terms.  The Test series against Australia in 1969–70 was to be their last for 22 years.

For a description of South African cricket in the years of isolation, see: International cricket in South Africa from 1971 to 1981.

Nelson Mandela was released from Victor Verster Prison in Paarl on 11 February 1990.  This event and date effectively marked the end of apartheid and the way was soon clear for the South African team to return to the international arena.

Domestic cricket from 1971 to 1990

Currie Cup winners from 1970-71 to 1989-90
 1970-71 Transvaal
 1971-72 Transvaal
 1972-73 Transvaal
 1973-74 Natal
 1974-75 Western Province
 1975-76 Natal

 1978-79 Transvaal
 1979-80 Transvaal
 1980-81 Natal
 1981-82 Western Province
 1982-83 Transvaal
 1983-84 Transvaal
 1984-85 Transvaal
 1985-86 Western Province
 1986-87 Transvaal
 1987-88 Transvaal
 1988-89 Eastern Province
 1989-90 Eastern Province and Western Province (shared)

Standard Bank Cup / B&H Series winners to 1989-90
This competition is a limited overs knockout with 50 overs per innings
 1981-82 Transvaal
 1982-83 Transvaal
 1983-84 Natal
 1984-85 Transvaal
 1985-86 Western Province
 1986-87 Western Province
 1987-88 Western Province
 1988-89 Orange Free State
 1989-90 Eastern Province

International tours of South Africa from 1970-71 to 1989-90
Despite the official ban on tours to South Africa during this period, several private tours did take place, some of them arousing great controversy. For information about the unofficial tours, see: International cricket in South Africa from 1971 to 1981 and South African rebel tours. South Africa resumed official international cricket in 1991 when the team made a short tour of India.  It then played in the 1992 Cricket World Cup in Australia and New Zealand.  All of the matches played during the rebel tours had been granted first-class status, but this was subsequently and controversially withdrawn by the ICC in 1993. In August 2007, the ICC was reviewing the status of all matches played in South Africa between 1961 and 1991, including those played during the rebel tours, with a view to restoring first-class status to some matches.

References

External sources
 CricketArchive – itinerary of South African cricket

Further reading
 Wisden Cricketers' Almanack 1991
 South African Cricket Annual – various editions
 Trevor Chesterfield, South Africa's Cricket Captains: From Melville to Wessels, New Holland Publishers, 1999
 various writers, A Century of South Africa in Test & International Cricket 1889-1989, Ball, 1989

1990
1990
1990